

Northeast

Connecticut 

There are two Connecticut teams in the American Hockey League. The Bridgeport Islanders is a farm team for the New York Islanders which competes at the Webster Bank Arena in Bridgeport. The Hartford Wolf Pack is the affiliate of the New York Rangers; they play in the XL Center in Hartford.

The Hartford Yard Goats of the Eastern League are a AA affiliate of the Colorado Rockies. Also, the Norwich Sea Unicorns play in the New York-Penn League and are an A affiliate of the Detroit Tigers. The New Britain Bees play in the Atlantic League of Professional Baseball. The Connecticut Sun of the WNBA currently play at the Mohegan Sun Arena in Uncasville. In soccer, Hartford Athletic will begin play in the USL Championship in 2019, serving as the reserve team for the New England Revolution of Major League Soccer.

The state hosts several major sporting events. Since 1952, a PGA Tour golf tournament has been played in the Hartford area. It was originally called the "Insurance City Open" and later the "Greater Hartford Open" and is now known as the Travelers Championship. The Connecticut Open tennis tournament is held annually in the Cullman-Heyman Tennis Center at Yale University in New Haven.

Lime Rock Park in Salisbury is a  road racing course, home to the International Motor Sports Association, SCCA, United States Auto Club, and K&N Pro Series East races. Thompson International Speedway, Stafford Motor Speedway, and Waterford Speedbowl are oval tracks holding weekly races for NASCAR Modifieds and other classes, including the NASCAR Whelen Modified Tour. The state also hosts several major mixed martial arts events for Bellator MMA and the Ultimate Fighting Championship.

Professional Sports Teams 

Hartford Whalers of the National Hockey League played in Hartford from 1975 to 1997 at the Hartford Civic Center. They departed to Raleigh, North Carolina after disputes with the state over the construction of a new arena, and they are now known as the Carolina Hurricanes. In 1926, Hartford had a franchise in the National Football League known as the Hartford Blues. They joined the National League for one season in 1876, making them the state's only Major League baseball franchise before moving to Brooklyn, New York and then disbanding one season later. From 2000 until 2006 the city was home to the Hartford FoxForce of World TeamTennis.

College Sports 

The Connecticut Huskies are the team of the University of Connecticut (UConn); they play NCAA Division I sports. Both the men's basketball and women's basketball teams have won multiple national championships. In 2004, UConn became the first school in NCAA Division I history to have its men's and women's basketball programs win the national title in the same year; they repeated the feat in 2014 and are still the only Division I school to win both titles in the same year. The UConn women's basketball team holds the record for the longest consecutive winning streak in NCAA college basketball at 111 games, a streak that ended in 2017. The UConn Huskies football team has played in the Football Bowl Subdivision since 2002, and has played in four bowl games.

New Haven biennially hosts "The Game" between the Yale Bulldogs and the Harvard Crimson, the country's second-oldest college football rivalry. Yale alumnus Walter Camp is deemed the "Father of American Football", and he helped develop modern football while living in New Haven. Other Connecticut universities which feature Division I sports teams are Quinnipiac University, Fairfield University, Central Connecticut State University, Sacred Heart University, and the University of Hartford.

Delaware

Maine 

Maine has never had a major professional sports team. Like most of New England, Mainers are fans of Boston sports teams.

Professional Sports Teams 

 Maine Red Claws, basketball, NBA G League
 Portland Sea Dogs, minor league baseball, Eastern League (1938–2020)
 Maine Mariners, ice hockey, ECHL

Non-professional Sports Teams 

 Portland Phoenix FC, soccer, Premier Developmental League
 Maine Roller Derby, roller derby, Women's Flat Track Derby Association

NCAA 

 Maine Black Bears

Maryland

Massachusetts

New Hampshire

New Jersey 

New Jersey currently has four teams from major professional sports leagues playing in the state, although the Major League Soccer team and two National Football League teams identify themselves as being from the New York metropolitan area.

Professional sports 

 

The National Hockey League's New Jersey Devils, based in Newark at the Prudential Center, is the only major league sports franchise to bear the state's name. Founded in 1974 in Kansas City, Missouri, as the Kansas City Scouts, the team played in Denver, Colorado, as the Colorado Rockies from 1976 until the spring of 1982 when naval architect, businessman, and Jersey City native John J. McMullen purchased, renamed, and moved the franchise to Brendan Byrne Arena in East Rutherford's Meadowlands Sports Complex. While the team had mostly losing records in Kansas City, Denver, and its first years in New Jersey, the Devils began to improve in the late 1980s and early 1990s under Hall of Fame president and general manager Lou Lamoriello. The team made the playoffs for the Stanley Cup in 2001 and 2012, and won it in 1995, 2000, and 2003. The organization is the youngest of the nine major league teams in the New York metropolitan area. The Devils have established a following throughout the northern and central portions of the state, carving a place in a media market once dominated by the New York Rangers and Islanders.

In 2018, the Philadelphia Flyers renovated and expanded their training facility, the Virtua Center Flyers Skate Zone, in Voorhees Township in the southern portion of the state.

The New York Metropolitan Area's two National Football League teams, the New York Giants and the New York Jets, play at MetLife Stadium in East Rutherford's Meadowlands Sports Complex. Built for about $1.6 billion, the venue is the most expensive stadium ever built. On February 2, 2014, MetLife Stadium hosted Super Bowl XLVIII.

The New York Red Bulls of Major League Soccer play in Red Bull Arena, a soccer-specific stadium in Harrison across the Passaic River from downtown Newark. On July 27, 2011, Red Bull Arena hosted the 2011 MLS All-Star Game.

From 1977 to 2012, New Jersey had a National Basketball Association team, the New Jersey Nets. WNBA's New York Liberty played in New Jersey from 2011 to 2013 while their primary home arena, Madison Square Garden was undergoing renovations. In 2016, the Philadelphia 76ers of the NBA opened their new headquarters and training facility, the Philadelphia 76ers Training Complex, in Camden.

The Meadowlands Sports Complex is home to the Meadowlands Racetrack, one of three major harness racing tracks in the state. The Meadowlands Racetrack and Freehold Raceway in Freehold are two of the major harness racing tracks in North America. Monmouth Park Racetrack in Oceanport is a popular spot for thoroughbred racing in New Jersey and the northeast. It hosted the Breeders' Cup in 2007, and its turf course was renovated in preparation.

Major league sports

New Jersey teams

New York teams that play in New Jersey

Semi-pro and minor league sports

New Jersey teams

New York minor league teams that play in New Jersey

College Sports

Major schools 

New Jerseyans' collegiate allegiances are predominantly split among the three major NCAA Division I programs in the state: the Rutgers University (New Jersey's flagship state university) Scarlet Knights, members of the Big Ten Conference; the Seton Hall University (the state's largest Catholic university) Pirates, members of the Big East Conference; and the Princeton University (the state's Ivy League university) Tigers.

The intense rivalry between Rutgers and Princeton athletics began with the first intercollegiate football game in 1869. The schools have not met on the football field since 1980, but they continue to play each other annually in all other sports offered by the two universities.

Rutgers, which fields 24 teams in various sports, is nationally known for its excellent football program, with a 6–4 all-time bowl record; and its excellent women's basketball programs, which appeared in a National Final in 2007. In 2008 and 2009, Rutgers expanded their football home HighPoint.com Stadium on the Busch Campus. The basketball teams play at Louis Brown Athletic Center on Livingston Campus. Both venues and campuses are in Piscataway, across the Raritan River from New Brunswick. The university also fields men's basketball and baseball programs. Rutgers' fans live mostly in the western parts of the state and Middlesex County; its alumni base is the largest in the state.

Rutgers' satellite campuses in Camden and Newark each field their own athletic programs — the Rutgers–Camden Scarlet Raptors and the Rutgers–Newark Scarlet Raiders — which both compete in NCAA Division III.

Seton Hall fields no football team, but its men's basketball team is one of the Big East's storied programs. No New Jersey team has won more games in the NCAA Division I men's basketball tournament, and it is the state's only men's basketball program to reach a modern National Final. The Pirates play their home games at Prudential Center in downtown Newark, about four miles from the university's South Orange campus. Their fans hail largely from in the predominantly Roman Catholic areas of the northern part of the state and the Jersey Shore. The annual inter-conference rivalry game between Seton Hall and Rutgers, whose venue alternates between Newark and Piscataway, the Garden State Hardwood Classic, is planned through 2026.

Other schools 

The state's other Division I schools include the Monmouth University Hawks (West Long Branch), the New Jersey Institute of Technology (NJIT) Highlanders (Newark), the Rider University Broncs (Lawrenceville), and the Saint Peter's University Peacocks and Peahens (Jersey City).

Fairleigh Dickinson University competes in both Division I and Division III. It has two campuses, each with its own sports teams. The teams at the Metropolitan Campus are known as the FDU Knights, and compete in the Northeast Conference and NCAA Division I. The College at Florham (FDU-Florham) teams are known as the FDU-Florham Devils and compete in the Middle Atlantic Conferences' Freedom Conference and NCAA Division III

Among the various Division III schools in the state, the Stevens Institute of Technology Ducks have fielded the longest continuously running collegiate men's lacrosse program in the country. 2009 marked the 125th season.

New York

Pennsylvania

Rhode Island

Vermont

Winter sports 

Winter sports are popular in New England, and Vermont's winter sports attractions are a big part of Vermont tourism. Some well known attractions include Burke Mountain ski area, Jay Peak Resort, Killington Ski Resort, Stowe Mountain Resort, the Quechee Club Ski Area, and Smugglers' Notch Resort.

Vermont natives in the snowboarding profession include Kevin Pearce, Ross Powers, Hannah Teter, and Kelly Clark. Others learned snowboarding in the state, such as Louie Vito and Ellery Hollingsworth.

Vermont Olympic gold medalists include Barbara Cochran,
Hannah Kearney,
Kelly Clark,
Ross Powers,
and Hannah Teter.

Baseball 

The largest professional franchise is the Vermont Lake Monsters, a single-A minor league baseball affiliate of the Oakland Athletics, based in Burlington. They were named the Vermont Expos before 2006. Up until the 2011 season, they were the affiliate of the Washington Nationals (formerly the Montreal Expos).

Basketball 

Currently the highest-ranked teams in basketball representing Vermont are the NCAA's Vermont Catamounts – male and female.

The Vermont Frost Heaves, the 2007 and 2008 American Basketball Association national champions, were a franchise of the Premier Basketball League, and were based in Barre and Burlington from the fall of 2006 through the winter of 2011.

Football 

The Vermont Bucks, an indoor football team, were based in Burlington and began play in 2017 as the founding team in the Can-Am Indoor Football League. For 2018, the Bucks joined the American Arena League, but folded prior to playing in the new league.

Hockey 

Vermont is home to the University of Vermont Men's and Women's hockey teams. Vermont's only professional hockey team was the Vermont Wild who played in the Federal Hockey League during the 2011–12 season, but the team folded before the season ended.

Soccer 

The Vermont Voltage were a USL Premier Development League soccer club that played in St. Albans.

Annually since 2002, high school statewide all stars compete against New Hampshire in ten sports during "Twin State" playoffs.

Motorsport 

Vermont also has a few auto racing venues. The most popular of them is Thunder Road International Speedbowl in Barre, Vermont. It is well known for its tight racing and has become well known in short track stock car racing. Other racing circuits include the USC sanctioned Bear Ridge Speedway, and the NASCAR sanctioned Devil's Bowl Speedway. Some NASCAR Cup drivers have come to Vermont circuits to compete against local weekly drivers such as Tony Stewart, Clint Bowyer, Kevin Harvick, Kenny Wallace, and Joe Nemechek. Kevin Lepage from Shelburne, Vermont is one of a few professional drivers from Vermont. Racing series in Vermont include NASCAR Whelen All-American Series, American Canadian Tour, and Vermont's own Tiger Sportsman Series.

Washington, D.C.

Midwest

Illinois

Indiana

Iowa

Kansas

Michigan

Minnesota

Missouri

Nebraska

North Dakota

Ohio

South Dakota

Wisconsin

South

Alabama

Arkansas

Florida

Georgia

Kentucky

Louisiana

Mississippi

North Carolina

Oklahoma

South Carolina

Tennessee

Texas

Virginia

West Virginia

West

Alaska

Arizona

California

Colorado

Hawaii

Idaho

Montana

Nevada

New Mexico

Oregon

Utah

Washington

Wyoming

Territories

American Samoa

Guam

Northern Mariana Islands

Puerto Rico

U.S. Virgin Islands

See also 

 Sports in the United States
 Women's sports in the United States
 Popular Games in United States by BallSportGear

Notes

References

Further reading 

 Gerdy, John R. Sports: The All-American Addiction (2002) online
 Gorn, Elliott J. A Brief History of American Sports (2004)
 Jackson III, Harvey H. ed. The New Encyclopedia of Southern Culture: Sports & Recreation (2011) online
 Jay, Kathryn. More Than Just a Game: Sports in American Life since 1945 (2004). online

External links 

 

Sports in the United States by state
Articles containing video clips